Thief Lake is a lake in Marshall County, in the U.S. state of Minnesota. The lake gives its name to the township that it stands on, Thief Lake Township. The lake is linked to the Red Lake River via Thief River. The two rivers meet at Thief River Falls.

The area is designated as a Wildlife management area.

See also
List of lakes in Minnesota

References

Lakes of Minnesota
Lakes of Marshall County, Minnesota